Kamenka is a town and the administrative center of Kamensky District in Penza Oblast, Russia, located on the Atmis River (a Moksha tributary)  west of Penza, the administrative center of the oblast. Population:    30,000 (1970).

History
It was founded in the 18th century and granted a town status in 1951.

Administrative and municipal status
Within the framework of administrative divisions, Kamenka serves as the administrative center of Kamensky District. As an administrative division, it is incorporated within Kamensky District as the town of district significance of Kamenka. As a municipal division, the town of district significance of Kamenka is incorporated within Kamensky Municipal District as Kamenka Urban Settlement.

Notable residents 

Nikolay Burdenko (1876–1946), surgeon, the founder of Russian neurosurgery
Anatoliy Chizhov (1934–2021), engineer and politician

References

Notes

Sources

External links

Official website of Kamenka 
Kamenka Business Directory 

Cities and towns in Penza Oblast
Nizhnelomovsky Uyezd
Populated places established in the 18th century